Iron Horse is a census-designated place (CDP) in Plumas County, California, United States. The population was 297 at the 2010 census, down from 321 at the 2000 census.

Geography
Iron Horse is located at  (39.789714, -120.495605).

Demographics

2010
At the 2010 census Iron Horse had a population of 297. The racial makeup of Iron Horse was 276 (92.9%) White, 0 (0.0%) African American, 0 (0.0%) Native American, 1 (0.3%) Asian, 0 (0.0%) Pacific Islander, 12 (4.0%) from other races, and 8 (2.7%) from two or more races. Hispanic or Latino of any race were 17 people (5.7%).

The whole population lived in households, no one lived in non-institutionalized group quarters and no one was institutionalized.

There were 126 households, 30 (23.8%) had children under the age of 18 living in them, 79 (62.7%) were opposite-sex married couples living together, 5 (4.0%) had a female householder with no husband present, 4 (3.2%) had a male householder with no wife present.  There were 12 (9.5%) unmarried opposite-sex partnerships, and 0 (0%) same-sex married couples or partnerships. 26 households (20.6%) were one person and 7 (5.6%) had someone living alone who was 65 or older. The average household size was 2.36.  There were 88 families (69.8% of households); the average family size was 2.75.

The age distribution was 51 people (17.2%) under the age of 18, 23 people (7.7%) aged 18 to 24, 53 people (17.8%) aged 25 to 44, 115 people (38.7%) aged 45 to 64, and 55 people (18.5%) who were 65 or older.  The median age was 49.0 years. For every 100 females, there were 96.7 males.  For every 100 females age 18 and over, there were 108.5 males.

There were 168 housing units at an average density of 21.7 per square mile, of the occupied units 101 (80.2%) were owner-occupied and 25 (19.8%) were rented. The homeowner vacancy rate was 7.3%; the rental vacancy rate was 16.7%.  242 people (81.5% of the population) lived in owner-occupied housing units and 55 people (18.5%) lived in rental housing units.

2000
At the 2000 census there were 321 people, 122 households, and 96 families in the CDP. There were 148 housing units at an average density of 16.1 per square mile (6.2/km). The racial makeup of the CDP was 92.83% White, 0.62% Black or African American, 0.62% Native American, 2.18% from other races, and 3.74% from two or more races.  5.61% of the population were Hispanic or Latino of any race.
Of the 122 households 33.6% had children under the age of 18 living with them, 69.7% were married couples living together, 7.4% had a female householder with no husband present, and 21.3% were non-families. 18.0% of households were one person and 6.6% were one person aged 65 or older.  The average household size was 2.63 and the average family size was 2.94.

The age distribution was 24.9% under the age of 18, 5.0% from 18 to 24, 26.8% from 25 to 44, 27.1% from 45 to 64, and 16.2% 65 or older.  The median age was 41 years. For every 100 females, there were 85.5 males.  For every 100 females age 18 and over, there were 94.4 males.

The median household income was $30,208 and the median family income  was $30,000. Males had a median income of $29,091 versus $25,938 for females. The per capita income for the CDP was $11,732.  About 14.0% of families and 9.8% of the population were below the poverty line, including none of those under age 18 and 22.2% of those age 65 or over.

Politics

References

Census-designated places in Plumas County, California
Census-designated places in California